Elections to Craigavon Borough Council were held on 21 May 1997 on the same day as the other Northern Irish local government elections. The election used four district electoral areas to elect a total of 26 councillors.

Election results

Note: "Votes" are the first preference votes.

Districts summary

|- class="unsortable" align="centre"
!rowspan=2 align="left"|Ward
! % 
!Cllrs
! % 
!Cllrs
! %
!Cllrs
! %
!Cllrs
! % 
!Cllrs
! %
!Cllrs
!rowspan=2|TotalCllrs
|- class="unsortable" align="center"
!colspan=2 bgcolor="" | UUP
!colspan=2 bgcolor="" | SDLP
!colspan=2 bgcolor="" | DUP
!colspan=2 bgcolor="" | Sinn Féin
!colspan=2 bgcolor="" | Alliance
!colspan=2 bgcolor="white"| Others
|-
|align="left"|Craigavon Central
|bgcolor="40BFF5"|43.6
|bgcolor="40BFF5"|3
|15.2
|1
|13.8
|1
|13.4
|1
|6.9
|1
|7.1
|0
|7
|-
|align="left"|Loughside
|7.2
|0
|bgcolor="#99FF66"|47.0
|bgcolor="#99FF66"|4
|1.3
|0
|35.3
|1
|0.9
|0
|8.3
|0
|5
|-
|align="left"|Lurgan
|bgcolor="40BFF5"|64.6
|bgcolor="40BFF5"|5
|7.6
|1
|17.8
|1
|4.3
|0
|4.9
|0
|0.8
|0
|7
|-
|align="left"|Portadown
|bgcolor="40BFF5"|37.7
|bgcolor="40BFF5"|3
|11.0
|1
|22.9
|1
|0.0
|0
|4.6
|0
|23.8
|2
|7
|- class="unsortable" class="sortbottom" style="background:#C9C9C9"
|align="left"| Total
|39.7
|11
|19.0
|7
|14.6
|3
|12.2
|2
|4.5
|1
|10.0
|2
|26
|-
|}

District results

Craigavon Central

1993: 3 x UUP, 1 x SDLP, 1 x DUP, 1 x Sinn Féin, 1 x Alliance
1997: 3 x UUP, 1 x SDLP, 1 x DUP, 1 x Sinn Féin, 1 x Alliance
1993-1997 Change: No change

Loughside

1993: 3 x SDLP, 1 x Sinn Féin, 1 x Workers' Party
1997: 4 x SDLP, 1 x Sinn Féin
1993-1997 Change: SDLP gain from Workers' Party

Lurgan

1993: 5 x UUP, 1 x DUP, 1 x SDLP
1997: 5 x UUP, 1 x DUP, 1 x SDLP
1993-1997 Change: No change

Portadown

1993: 3 x UUP, 2 x DUP, 1 x SDLP, 1 x Alliance
1997: 3 x UUP, 2 x Independent Nationalist, 1 x DUP, 1 x SDLP
1993-1997 Change: Independent Nationalist (two seats) gain from DUP and Alliance

References

Craigavon Borough Council elections
Craigavon